Bodysong is a 2003 BAFTA-winning documentary about human life and the human condition directed by Simon Pummell and produced by Janine Marmot.

Synopsis 

The film tells the story of an archetypal human life using images taken from all around the world and the last 100 years of cinema.

The images span the microcosm (inside the body), through the individual (the first cry of a new-born baby), to the macrocosm (accumulated archive footage of ritual celebration and the carnage of war).

The editing, music, and the mythic narrative arc of the material is designed to take the viewer on a roller coaster tour of the human body and life cycle. Every possible depiction of the human life from microscopic medical to portraits and newsreels, from births to deaths, are cut to a music track by Jonny Greenwood of Radiohead to create a mythic narrative of the arc of a single life.

Hollywood director Paul Thomas Anderson saw the film at its Rotterdam Festival premiere: "I remember seeing Bodysong and feeling like I was in a trance. A wonderful collection of the two simple things a film has to work with: pictures and music. It's a moving, scary and hypnotic potpourri of images and an experience that gets more lucid the more you watch ...The website, which is 50% of the experience is a testament to the strong, caring research and a dedication to wonderful material."

Release

The film was released by Pathé in 2003 with a limited collector's edition released on DVD by the BFI in 2010, which included original essays by William Gibson, Geoff Andrew, Gareth Evans and Matt Hanson.

Awards 

The film won a BAFTA Interactive Award in 2004 and Best British Documentary at the British Independent Film Award in 2003.

References

External links

2003 films
2003 documentary films
British documentary films
British avant-garde and experimental films
Film4 Productions films
Films without speech
Non-narrative films
Films scored by Jonny Greenwood
2000s avant-garde and experimental films
Collage film
2000s British films